Bryant Reeves (born June 8, 1973) is an American former professional basketball player. Reeves spent his entire career with the National Basketball Association's Vancouver Grizzlies, playing with the team from 1995 until 2001. He was nicknamed "Big Country" by his college teammate Byron Houston after Reeves was amazed by the size of the United States following his first cross-country airplane flight, having grown up in the small community of Gans, Oklahoma.

College career
He had a strong collegiate career with Oklahoma State University, where he averaged 21.5 points per game as a senior and led OSU to the 1995 Final Four.

Professional career

Vancouver / Memphis Grizzlies (1995–2002) 
Reeves became the Grizzlies' first-ever draft choice, selected sixth overall in the 1995 NBA draft.

Reeves played six seasons with the Grizzlies. After averaging 13.3 points per game in a solid rookie season, he averaged 16.2 points per game in 1996–97 season and was subsequently awarded with a six-year, $61.8 million contract extension. The next season was his best, when he averaged 16.3 points, 7.9 rebounds, and 1.08 blocked shots per game. During that season he scored a career-high 41 points against the Boston Celtics.

After 1998, weight-control problems and injuries began to take a toll on Reeves, and his numbers fell off dramatically. He was still the starting center for the Grizzlies, but his minutes per game dropped, and his field goal percentage dropped significantly. Eventually, after the Grizzlies moved to Memphis, Tennessee in 2001, Reeves started the season on the injured list due to chronic back pain and was never able to play another game (the only games he played with the team in Memphis were two preseason games). During the preseason play in the fall of 2001, Reeves had experienced back pain and had to be taken off the court on two connected stretchers carried by eight of his teammates. On January 29, 2002, the Grizzlies announced Reeves' retirement from the league due to chronic back pain caused by degenerative discs. At the time he was the Grizzlies all-time leader in games played with 395.

NBA career statistics

Regular season

|-
| align="left" | 1995–96
| align="left" | Vancouver
| 77 || 63 || 24.9 ||.457 ||.000 ||.732 || 7.4 ||1.4 ||0.6 ||0.7 || 13.3
|-
| align="left" | 1996–97
| align="left" | Vancouver
| 75 ||75 || 37.0 || .486 || .091 ||.704 || 8.1 || 2.1 || 0.4 || 0.9 || 16.2
|-
| align="left" | 1997–98
| align="left" | Vancouver
| 74 || 74 ||34.1 || .523 ||.000 ||.706 ||7.9 ||2.1 ||0.5 || 1.1 || 16.3
|-
| align="left" | 1998–99
| align="left" | Vancouver
| 25 ||14 || 28.1 ||.406 || .000 ||.578 ||5.5 ||1.5 ||0.5 || 0.3 || 10.8
|-
| align="left" | 1999–00
| align="left" | Vancouver
| 69 ||67 || 25.7 ||.448 ||.000 || .648 || 5.7 ||1.2 ||0.5 || 0.6 || 8.9
|-
| align="left" | 2000–01
| align="left" | Vancouver
|75 ||48 ||24.4 ||.460 ||.250 || .796 ||6.0 ||1.1 ||0.6 || 0.7 || 8.3
|- class="sortbottom"
| style="text-align:center;" colspan="2"| Career
| 395 || 341 ||30.6 ||.475 ||.074 ||.703 ||6.9 ||1.6 || 0.5 || 0.8 ||12.5 
|-

Personal life
Bryant was the subject of Kathleen Jayme's documentary film Finding Big Country in 2018. Following his career, Reeves went back to Oklahoma and is now a cattle farmer and a family man.

See also
 List of NCAA Division I men's basketball players with 2000 points and 1000 rebounds

References

External links
Historical Player Profile at NBA.com

TheDraftReview.com: Bryant Reeves's NBA Draft History Page

1973 births
Living people
All-American college men's basketball players
American expatriate basketball people in Canada
American men's basketball players
Basketball players from Arkansas
Basketball players from Oklahoma
Centers (basketball)
Oklahoma State Cowboys basketball players
People from Sequoyah County, Oklahoma
Sportspeople from Fort Smith, Arkansas
Vancouver Grizzlies draft picks
Vancouver Grizzlies players